Liberty Township is one of six townships in Tipton County, Indiana, United States. As of the 2010 census, its population was 2,471 and it contained 1,014 housing units.

History

A man with the surname of Kaywood was the first white settler in what is now Liberty Township. He built the first known log cabin in the township. The next known settler was William Riggs, who came from Madison County, Indiana in 1853. During the years of early settlement, settlers had to travel to New London, Lafayette, or Perkinsville.

Prior to its founding, Liberty Township was a part of Prairie Township and Wildcat Township. After June 1849, county officials decided to create "a new township organized out of the west part of Wildcat Township, to be called Liberty Township..."  In September 1851, a two-mile piece of Prairie Township was added to Liberty Township. Sharpsville was considered for the county seat that same year, but Tipton would end up having that role.

Geography

Natural environment

Historically, the township had rich soil which was valuable for agriculture. Timber was plentiful and included walnut, poplar, oak, sycamore, elm, beech, maple, hickory and ash.

Cities, towns, villages
 Sharpsville

Unincorporated towns
 Nevada at 
(This list is based on USGS data and may include former settlements.)

Adjacent townships
 Taylor Township, Howard County (north)
 Wildcat Township (east)
 Cicero Township (south)
 Prairie Township (west)
 Harrison Township, Howard County (northwest)

Economy

Historically, Liberty Township was known for agriculture, with corn being the most popular crop. Oats, wheat, hay, tomatoes, peas, and beans were also commonly farmed, the latter three primarily for canning.

Government

Political districts
 Indiana's 5th congressional district
 State House District 32
 State Senate District 21

Education

Early history

The first school in the township was built in Sharpsville and began operation in 1852. Martha Ann Grishaw was the teacher. A second school was built, right downtown, just after the first school. All schools were operated on the subscription model. Public schools became available in 1852.

Today
Students in Liberty Township attend Tri-Central Community Schools.

Infrastructure

Cemeteries
The township contains these four cemeteries: Jackson, Barlow (aka Mudcreek), Sharp, and Turner.

References

Sources
 Pershing, Marvin W. "History of Tipton County, Indiana: Her People, Industries and Institutions". Indianapolis: B.F. Bowen (1914).

External links
 Indiana Township Association
 United Township Association of Indiana

Townships in Tipton County, Indiana
Kokomo, Indiana metropolitan area
Townships in Indiana